Gerald Warr (born 17 May 1939) is an Australian cricketer. He played in two first-class matches for Queensland in 1960/61.

See also
 List of Queensland first-class cricketers

References

External links
 

1939 births
Living people
Australian cricketers
Queensland cricketers
Cricketers from New South Wales